The 2001–02 Nashville Predators season was the Nashville Predators' fourth season in the National Hockey League (NHL). The Predators missed the playoffs for the fourth straight year.

Off-season

Regular season

Final standings

Schedule and results

|- align="center" bgcolor="#FFBBBB"
|1||L||October 5, 2001||1–4 || align="left"| @ Dallas Stars (2001–02) ||0–1–0–0 || 
|- align="center" 
|2||T||October 6, 2001||2–2 OT|| align="left"|  St. Louis Blues (2001–02) ||0–1–1–0 || 
|- align="center" bgcolor="#CCFFCC" 
|3||W||October 11, 2001||1–0 || align="left"|  Calgary Flames (2001–02) ||1–1–1–0 || 
|- align="center" bgcolor="#FFBBBB"
|4||L||October 13, 2001||3–4 || align="left"|  Edmonton Oilers (2001–02) ||1–2–1–0 || 
|- align="center" 
|5||T||October 16, 2001||3–3 OT|| align="left"| @ Buffalo Sabres (2001–02) ||1–2–2–0 || 
|- align="center" bgcolor="#FFBBBB"
|6||L||October 18, 2001||3–5 || align="left"|  Chicago Blackhawks (2001–02) ||1–3–2–0 || 
|- align="center" bgcolor="#FFBBBB"
|7||L||October 20, 2001||1–2 || align="left"|  Boston Bruins (2001–02) ||1–4–2–0 || 
|- align="center" bgcolor="#CCFFCC" 
|8||W||October 22, 2001||4–2 || align="left"| @ Edmonton Oilers (2001–02) ||2–4–2–0 || 
|- align="center" bgcolor="#FFBBBB"
|9||L||October 23, 2001||2–4 || align="left"| @ Vancouver Canucks (2001–02) ||2–5–2–0 || 
|- align="center" bgcolor="#CCFFCC" 
|10||W||October 25, 2001||5–4 OT|| align="left"| @ Calgary Flames (2001–02) ||3–5–2–0 || 
|- align="center" bgcolor="#FFBBBB"
|11||L||October 27, 2001||0–1 || align="left"|  Detroit Red Wings (2001–02) ||3–6–2–0 || 
|- align="center" bgcolor="#FFBBBB"
|12||L||October 30, 2001||2–4 || align="left"|  Minnesota Wild (2001–02) ||3–7–2–0 || 
|- align="center" bgcolor="#CCFFCC" 
|13||W||October 31, 2001||6–4 || align="left"| @ Minnesota Wild (2001–02) ||4–7–2–0 || 
|-

|- align="center" bgcolor="#FFBBBB"
|14||L||November 2, 2001||0–3 || align="left"| @ Dallas Stars (2001–02) ||4–8–2–0 || 
|- align="center" bgcolor="#CCFFCC" 
|15||W||November 3, 2001||4–1 || align="left"|  Dallas Stars (2001–02) ||5–8–2–0 || 
|- align="center" bgcolor="#FFBBBB"
|16||L||November 8, 2001||1–3 || align="left"| @ Montreal Canadiens (2001–02) ||5–9–2–0 || 
|- align="center" bgcolor="#FFBBBB"
|17||L||November 10, 2001||2–3 || align="left"| @ Ottawa Senators (2001–02) ||5–10–2–0 || 
|- align="center" bgcolor="#CCFFCC" 
|18||W||November 13, 2001||4–1 || align="left"|  Buffalo Sabres (2001–02) ||6–10–2–0 || 
|- align="center" 
|19||T||November 16, 2001||4–4 OT|| align="left"| @ Atlanta Thrashers (2001–02) ||6–10–3–0 || 
|- align="center" bgcolor="#CCFFCC" 
|20||W||November 17, 2001||3–2 || align="left"|  Columbus Blue Jackets (2001–02) ||7–10–3–0 || 
|- align="center" bgcolor="#FFBBBB"
|21||L||November 20, 2001||3–6 || align="left"| @ Detroit Red Wings (2001–02) ||7–11–3–0 || 
|- align="center" bgcolor="#CCFFCC" 
|22||W||November 21, 2001||4–3 || align="left"|  Chicago Blackhawks (2001–02) ||8–11–3–0 || 
|- align="center" bgcolor="#CCFFCC" 
|23||W||November 23, 2001||5–0 || align="left"|  Pittsburgh Penguins (2001–02) ||9–11–3–0 || 
|- align="center" bgcolor="#FFBBBB"
|24||L||November 27, 2001||2–3 || align="left"| @ San Jose Sharks (2001–02) ||9–12–3–0 || 
|- align="center" bgcolor="#FFBBBB"
|25||L||November 29, 2001||0–1 || align="left"| @ Phoenix Coyotes (2001–02) ||9–13–3–0 || 
|-

|- align="center" bgcolor="#FFBBBB"
|26||L||December 1, 2001||2–4 || align="left"| @ Los Angeles Kings (2001–02) ||9–14–3–0 || 
|- align="center" bgcolor="#FFBBBB"
|27||L||December 2, 2001||2–4 || align="left"| @ Mighty Ducks of Anaheim (2001–02) ||9–15–3–0 || 
|- align="center" bgcolor="#CCFFCC" 
|28||W||December 6, 2001||4–2 || align="left"|  Ottawa Senators (2001–02) ||10–15–3–0 || 
|- align="center" 
|29||T||December 8, 2001||2–2 OT|| align="left"|  Edmonton Oilers (2001–02) ||10–15–4–0 || 
|- align="center" 
|30||T||December 11, 2001||1–1 OT|| align="left"|  Los Angeles Kings (2001–02) ||10–15–5–0 || 
|- align="center" bgcolor="#CCFFCC" 
|31||W||December 12, 2001||4–2 || align="left"| @ New York Rangers (2001–02) ||11–15–5–0 || 
|- align="center" bgcolor="#CCFFCC" 
|32||W||December 15, 2001||5–2 || align="left"|  Chicago Blackhawks (2001–02) ||12–15–5–0 || 
|- align="center" bgcolor="#CCFFCC" 
|33||W||December 20, 2001||6–2 || align="left"|  Vancouver Canucks (2001–02) ||13–15–5–0 || 
|- align="center" 
|34||T||December 23, 2001||1–1 OT|| align="left"|  San Jose Sharks (2001–02) ||13–15–6–0 || 
|- align="center" bgcolor="#FFBBBB"
|35||L||December 26, 2001||0–1 || align="left"|  Tampa Bay Lightning (2001–02) ||13–16–6–0 || 
|- align="center" bgcolor="#CCFFCC" 
|36||W||December 29, 2001||3–2 OT|| align="left"|  Detroit Red Wings (2001–02) ||14–16–6–0 || 
|- align="center" bgcolor="#FFBBBB"
|37||L||December 30, 2001||2–7 || align="left"| @ St. Louis Blues (2001–02) ||14–17–6–0 || 
|-

|- align="center" 
|38||T||January 1, 2002||4–4 OT|| align="left"|  Colorado Avalanche (2001–02) ||14–17–7–0 || 
|- align="center" bgcolor="#CCFFCC" 
|39||W||January 3, 2002||4–3 || align="left"| @ New Jersey Devils (2001–02) ||15–17–7–0 || 
|- align="center" bgcolor="#FFBBBB"
|40||L||January 4, 2002||1–2 || align="left"| @ Minnesota Wild (2001–02) ||15–18–7–0 || 
|- align="center" bgcolor="#FFBBBB"
|41||L||January 6, 2002||3–4 || align="left"| @ Columbus Blue Jackets (2001–02) ||15–19–7–0 || 
|- align="center" bgcolor="#FFBBBB"
|42||L||January 8, 2002||3–4 || align="left"| @ Toronto Maple Leafs (2001–02) ||15–20–7–0 || 
|- align="center" 
|43||T||January 10, 2002||2–2 OT|| align="left"|  Minnesota Wild (2001–02) ||15–20–8–0 || 
|- align="center" bgcolor="#CCFFCC" 
|44||W||January 12, 2002||2–1 || align="left"|  Mighty Ducks of Anaheim (2001–02) ||16–20–8–0 || 
|- align="center" bgcolor="#FFBBBB"
|45||L||January 14, 2002||3–5 || align="left"| @ Mighty Ducks of Anaheim (2001–02) ||16–21–8–0 || 
|- align="center" bgcolor="#FFBBBB"
|46||L||January 15, 2002||0–2 || align="left"| @ Los Angeles Kings (2001–02) ||16–22–8–0 || 
|- align="center" bgcolor="#CCFFCC" 
|47||W||January 17, 2002||3–2 OT|| align="left"|  Toronto Maple Leafs (2001–02) ||17–22–8–0 || 
|- align="center" bgcolor="#CCFFCC" 
|48||W||January 19, 2002||2–1 || align="left"|  Columbus Blue Jackets (2001–02) ||18–22–8–0 || 
|- align="center" bgcolor="#FFBBBB"
|49||L||January 21, 2002||0–1 || align="left"|  Phoenix Coyotes (2001–02) ||18–23–8–0 || 
|- align="center" 
|50||T||January 23, 2002||2–2 OT|| align="left"| @ Carolina Hurricanes (2001–02) ||18–23–9–0 || 
|- align="center" bgcolor="#CCFFCC" 
|51||W||January 24, 2002||3–2 OT|| align="left"| @ Philadelphia Flyers (2001–02) ||19–23–9–0 || 
|- align="center" bgcolor="#FFBBBB"
|52||L||January 26, 2002||1–3 || align="left"|  Mighty Ducks of Anaheim (2001–02) ||19–24–9–0 || 
|- align="center" bgcolor="#FFBBBB"
|53||L||January 28, 2002||1–5 || align="left"| @ Vancouver Canucks (2001–02) ||19–25–9–0 || 
|- align="center" bgcolor="#CCFFCC" 
|54||W||January 30, 2002||5–2 || align="left"| @ Colorado Avalanche (2001–02) ||20–25–9–0 || 
|-

|- align="center" bgcolor="#CCFFCC" 
|55||W||February 6, 2002||2–1 || align="left"|  Dallas Stars (2001–02) ||21–25–9–0 || 
|- align="center" 
|56||T||February 8, 2002||3–3 OT|| align="left"|  Washington Capitals (2001–02) ||21–25–10–0 || 
|- align="center" bgcolor="#CCFFCC" 
|57||W||February 9, 2002||1–0 OT|| align="left"| @ Columbus Blue Jackets (2001–02) ||22–25–10–0 || 
|- align="center" bgcolor="#CCFFCC" 
|58||W||February 12, 2002||1–0 || align="left"|  Florida Panthers (2001–02) ||23–25–10–0 || 
|- align="center" bgcolor="#FFBBBB"
|59||L||February 26, 2002||1–5 || align="left"|  San Jose Sharks (2001–02) ||23–26–10–0 || 
|- align="center" bgcolor="#CCFFCC" 
|60||W||February 28, 2002||3–2 || align="left"| @ Edmonton Oilers (2001–02) ||24–26–10–0 || 
|-

|- align="center" bgcolor="#FFBBBB"
|61||L||March 2, 2002||2–5 || align="left"| @ Calgary Flames (2001–02) ||24–27–10–0 || 
|- align="center" bgcolor="#CCFFCC" 
|62||W||March 5, 2002||2–0 || align="left"| @ San Jose Sharks (2001–02) ||25–27–10–0 || 
|- align="center" bgcolor="#FFBBBB"
|63||L||March 7, 2002||2–3 || align="left"|  Los Angeles Kings (2001–02) ||25–28–10–0 || 
|- align="center" 
|64||T||March 9, 2002||2–2 OT|| align="left"| @ Florida Panthers (2001–02) ||25–28–11–0 || 
|- align="center" bgcolor="#FFBBBB"
|65||L||March 10, 2002||1–5 || align="left"| @ Tampa Bay Lightning (2001–02) ||25–29–11–0 || 
|- align="center" bgcolor="#FFBBBB"
|66||L||March 12, 2002||0–5 || align="left"|  Vancouver Canucks (2001–02) ||25–30–11–0 || 
|- align="center" bgcolor="#FFBBBB"
|67||L||March 15, 2002||2–3 || align="left"|  Phoenix Coyotes (2001–02) ||25–31–11–0 || 
|- align="center" bgcolor="#FFBBBB"
|68||L||March 17, 2002||4–5 || align="left"|  Colorado Avalanche (2001–02) ||25–32–11–0 || 
|- align="center" bgcolor="#FFBBBB"
|69||L||March 19, 2002||1–5 || align="left"| @ St. Louis Blues (2001–02) ||25–33–11–0 || 
|- align="center" bgcolor="#FFBBBB"
|70||L||March 21, 2002||3–4 || align="left"|  New Jersey Devils (2001–02) ||25–34–11–0 || 
|- align="center" bgcolor="#CCFFCC" 
|71||W||March 23, 2002||5–1 || align="left"|  Montreal Canadiens (2001–02) ||26–34–11–0 || 
|- align="center" 
|72||T||March 25, 2002||3–3 OT|| align="left"|  Detroit Red Wings (2001–02) ||26–34–12–0 || 
|- align="center" bgcolor="#FFBBBB"
|73||L||March 27, 2002||1–4 || align="left"| @ Chicago Blackhawks (2001–02) ||26–35–12–0 || 
|- align="center" 
|74||T||March 28, 2002||3–3 OT|| align="left"| @ Detroit Red Wings (2001–02) ||26–35–13–0 || 
|- align="center" bgcolor="#FFBBBB"
|75||L||March 30, 2002||2–4 || align="left"|  St. Louis Blues (2001–02) ||26–36–13–0 || 
|-

|- align="center" bgcolor="#FFBBBB"
|76||L||April 1, 2002||1–5 || align="left"| @ Colorado Avalanche (2001–02) ||26–37–13–0 || 
|- align="center" bgcolor="#CCFFCC" 
|77||W||April 3, 2002||3–1 || align="left"| @ Chicago Blackhawks (2001–02) ||27–37–13–0 || 
|- align="center" bgcolor="#FFBBBB"
|78||L||April 4, 2002||1–2 || align="left"| @ Columbus Blue Jackets (2001–02) ||27–38–13–0 || 
|- align="center" bgcolor="#CCFFCC" 
|79||W||April 6, 2002||3–1 || align="left"|  Calgary Flames (2001–02) ||28–38–13–0 || 
|- align="center" bgcolor="#FFBBBB"
|80||L||April 9, 2002||2–3 || align="left"| @ St. Louis Blues (2001–02) ||28–39–13–0 || 
|- align="center" bgcolor="#FFBBBB"
|81||L||April 11, 2002||2–5 || align="left"|  New York Islanders (2001–02) ||28–40–13–0 || 
|- align="center" bgcolor="#FFBBBB"
|82||L||April 14, 2002||4–6 || align="left"| @ Phoenix Coyotes (2001–02) ||28–41–13–0 || 
|-

|-
| Legend:

Player statistics

Scoring
 Position abbreviations: C = Center; D = Defense; G = Goaltender; LW = Left Wing; RW = Right Wing
  = Joined team via a transaction (e.g., trade, waivers, signing) during the season. Stats reflect time with the Predators only.
  = Left team via a transaction (e.g., trade, waivers, release) during the season. Stats reflect time with the Predators only.

Goaltending

Awards and records

Transactions
The Predators were involved in the following transactions from June 10, 2001, the day after the deciding game of the 2001 Stanley Cup Finals, through June 13, 2002, the day of the deciding game of the 2002 Stanley Cup Finals.

Trades

Players acquired

Players lost

Signings

Draft picks
Nashville's draft picks at the 2001 NHL Entry Draft held at the National Car Rental Center in Sunrise, Florida.

See also
2001–02 NHL season

Notes

References

Nash
Nash
Nashville Predators seasons